Joel de la Fuente (born April 21, 1969) is an American actor. He first gained recognition for his role as 1st Lieutenant Paul Wang in Space: Above and Beyond, and is best known for his roles as Dr. Johann Pryce in Hemlock Grove, Kempeitai Chief Inspector Takeshi Kido in The Man in the High Castle and recurring appearances on Law & Order: Special Victims Unit as Technical Assistance Response Unit Tech Ruben Morales. He recently played Mark Nava in William Atticus Parker's 2023 film Atrabilious.

Early life and education
De la Fuente was born in New Hartford, New York, the middle of three boys born to Filipino immigrant parents; his older brother is two years older and his younger brother is six years younger. He grew up in Evanston, Illinois, and graduated from North Shore Country Day School in Winnetka, Illinois, in 1987. He received his BA degree in theatre arts in 1991 from Brown University, and his MFA degree in 1994 from NYU's graduate acting program at the Tisch School of the Arts.

Filmography

Film 
 Roommates (1995) as Toby
 Personal Velocity: Three Portraits (2002) as Thavi Matola
 The Happening (2008) as Realtor
 Taking Chance (2009) as Ticketing Agent
 The Adjustment Bureau (2011) as Thompson's aide
 Brief Reunion (2011) as Aaron
 Forgetting the Girl (2012) as Derek
 Julia (2014) as Dr. Lin
 Ava's Possessions (2015) as Escobar
 Red Sparrow (2018) as U.S. Senator

Television 
 Due South (1994) as Charlie Wong (Episode "Chinatown")
 Space: Above and Beyond (1995–1996) as Lt. Paul Wang (main role)
 High Incident (1996) as Detective Aquino (3 episodes)
 When the Cradle Falls (1997) as Bill Avila (TV Movie)
 ER (1997) as Med Student Ivan Fu (2 episodes)
 100 Centre Street (2001–2002) as Peter Davies (12 episodes)
 Law & Order: Special Victims Unit (2002–2011) as TARU Tech Ruben Morales (52 episodes)
 All My Children (2007) as Seamus Wong (4 episodes)
 Canterbury's Law (2008) as Assistant Attorney General Peter Upton (2 episodes)
 Nurse Jackie (2011) as a priest (1 episode)
 Hemlock Grove (2013–2015) as Dr. Johann Pryce (main role)
 Blue Bloods (2015) as Edward Gomez (Episode: "Flags of Our Fathers")
 The Man in the High Castle (2015–2019) as Chief Inspector Kido (main role, 39 episodes)
 Limitless (2016) as Daniel Lee (Episode: "A Dog's Breakfast")
 Madam Secretary (2017–2019) as President Datu Andrada (3 episodes)
 Bull (2017) as Brent Janson (Episode: "How to Dodge a Bullet")
 Manifest (2018–2020) as Dr. Brian Cardoso (2 episodes)
 The Blacklist (2019) as Dr. Guillermo Rizal (Episode: Guillermo Rizal")
 Devils (2022) as Cheng Liwei
 The Good Doctor (TV series) (2022) as Jacob (Episode: Growth Opportunities)
 The Mysterious Benedict Society (2022) as Officer "Cannonball" Zhao (2 episodes)
 Hello Tomorrow! (2023) as Bill Blankenship (1 episode)

Video games 
 The Warriors (2005) as Additional Civilian
 Homefront (2011) as Hopper Lee

Theatre 
 Hold These Truths (2018) as Gordon Hirabayashi, others

See also 
 Filipinos in the New York City metropolitan region

References

External links 
 
 
 

1969 births
Living people
American male film actors
American male television actors
Brown University alumni
Male actors from New York (state)
American male actors of Filipino descent
American male actors of Chinese descent
People from New Hartford, New York
American people of Malaysian descent
American people of Portuguese descent
Tisch School of the Arts alumni
20th-century American male actors
21st-century American male actors